Deon William Swiggs (born 6 September 1986) is a New Zealand politician serving as the Environment Canterbury Councillor representing the Christchurch West/Ōpuna Regional Constituency. He previously served as the Christchurch City Councillor representing the Central ward from 2016 to 2019. Prior to Swiggs being elected, he was most well known for his participation in Rebuild Christchurch, an organisation founded after the 2010 Canterbury earthquake.

Early life and up to 2019 

Swiggs was born in Nelson, New Zealand, and is the oldest of three siblings. Until Swiggs was 5, he was raised at Parihaka Pa as a Christian. Swiggs was educated at Marlborough Boys' College where he was a sixth form prefect. After graduating in 2004, Swiggs joined the Royal New Zealand Navy in 2005 as a navigation officer. Swiggs left the Navy in 2008 to pursue a career in the business sector. In 2008, Swiggs worked as a real estate agent for Harcourts in New Plymouth before transferring to Christchurch in 2009. He left the company in 2010 to form Swiggs Consulting Limited. Later in 2010, Swiggs was offered the position of South Island Accounts Manager at AdzUp.

At the time of the 2010 Canterbury earthquake, Swiggs was working for AdzUp, two days later he founded Rebuild Christchurch, which collated information from a variety of sources and placed this information in an easy to understand format. Swiggs has been called one of the innovate new entrepreneurs born out of the Christchurch earthquakes. On 22 February 2011, Swiggs was in the AdzUp office located in the Christchurch CBD when the first earthquake struck.

In April 2011, Swiggs was made redundant from AdzUp due to the earthquakes. From this time, Swiggs worked full-time on RebuildChristchurch.co.nz and studied on the side. In 2012, Swiggs was nominated for Young New Zealander of the Year.  and was named alongside Roger Sutton and Bob Parker as a leader in the Canterbury Rebuild.

Swiggs was accepted into a placement at the Christchurch Polytechnic Institute of Technology in February 2013 into a Bachelor of Applied Management. In March 2013, Swiggs Graduated from CPIT with Bachelor of Applied Management Majoring in Sales and Marketing  and Graduate Diploma in Innovation and Entrepreneurship. The Press reported on 27 April 2013 that Swiggs was contemplating running for Councillor of the Christchurch City Council.

On 26 August 2013, Swiggs announced he had put his nomination forward for the Christchurch East by-election. On 22 September 2013 Swiggs found his nomination was unsuccessful. Poto Williams was selected and elected Member of Parliament.

In July 2015, Swiggs and Christchurch broadcaster Chris Lynch along with award-winning filmmaker Gerard Smyth spent a week interviewing various citizens of Christchurch about their views on the Christchurch Earthquake Recovery Act draft transition recovery plan, which expired in April 2016. As of 28 July, the video, When a City Falls, has been watched more than 30,000 times.

On 31 May 2016, Swiggs announced that he would stand for Christchurch City Council as an independent in the newly created Christchurch Central ward in the 2016 local body elections. On 8 October 2016, he was elected to the council.

Swiggs was a founding trustee on the Canterbury Insurance Advocacy Service funded by council to advocate for people with insurance issues. Swiggs resigned as a trustee on 23 December 2016.

In September 2019 Swiggs identified himself as the councillor accused of sending "grossly inappropriate", sexually explicit messages to young people, and made young people feel unsafe and uncomfortable through touching and other comments made at events. He denied any allegation of misconduct.

Screenshots released by Swiggs on 3 October 2019 show some of the messages related to the complaint made by the Canterbury Youth Workers Collective. A preliminary investigation revealed that two of the complaints warranted further investigation, while a third complaint was referred to another agency, presumed to be the police. In the 2019 New Zealand local elections, Swiggs was unsuccessful in being re-elected.

Present

Presently, Swiggs is the chair of The Rebuild Build Christchurch Foundation, director of Rebuild Christchurch and the Councillor-Elect for the Christchurch West/Ōpuna Constituency for Environment Canterbury. Elected in the 2022 New Zealand local elections, he joined Craig Pauling as Councillor for the Christchurch West/Ōpuna Constituency.

Projects 
Swiggs has worked on the following projects;

 Project Christmas 
 Lets Get It Done 
 Football in the Gap 
 The Canterbury Insurance Assistance Service
 Buck Brings Back Marmite 
 A Beautiful Struggle
 Christchurch Panoramas
 Eyes East

Personal life 
Swiggs was the first openly gay Christchurch councillor. He is a supporter of the LGBTQ community.

Awards
 Local Hero Award in New Zealander of the Year Awards  
 Christchurch City Council Service Award for Youth  
 Community Service Award

References

Living people
Christchurch City Councillors
People associated with the 2011 Christchurch earthquake
1986 births
People educated at Marlborough Boys' College
Australian Institute of Business alumni